Sion may refer to

 an alternative transliteration of Zion

People 
 Sion (name) or Siôn, a Welsh and other given name and surname, including a list of people and fictional characters with the name
 Shion or Sion, a Japanese given name

Places

France
 Sion, Gers, France
 Sion, Saxon-Sion, Meurthe-et-Moselle department, France
 Sion-les-Mines, Loire-Atlantique department, France
 Sion-sur-l'Océan, Vendee department, France
 Mont Sion, namesake of the Priory of Sion

India
 Sion, Mumbai, India
Sion Causeway
Sion Creek
Sion Hillock Fort
Sion railway station (India)

Switzerland
 Sion, Switzerland
 Sion District
 Sion Airport
 Sion railway station (Switzerland)
 Roman Catholic Diocese of Sion
 Sion Cathedral

Elsewhere
 Sion (Asia Minor), a former ancient city and bishopric, and present Latin Catholic titular see in Asian Turkey
 Sion, Alberta, Canada
 Sion, Czech Republic, a castle
 Sion, Netherlands

Other uses 
 Sion (periodical), official organ of the Armenian Patriarchate of Jerusalem
 Sion, a 1987 novel by Vojislav V. Jovanović
 Sion College, a former college, guild of parochial clergy and almshouse in London
 Sono Motors Sion, an electric car
 FC Sion, a Swiss football team
 Sion, an independent heavy metal band founded by Howard Jones and Jared Dines.

See also 

 Mount Sion (disambiguation)
 Sion Hill (disambiguation)
 Sion railway station (disambiguation)
 Scion (disambiguation)
 Sioni (disambiguation)
 Sione
 Syon (disambiguation)
 Xion (disambiguation)
 Zion (disambiguation)
 Benei Sión, also known as Sabatarios and Cabañistas in Chile, are an ethno-religious group
 Sion's minimax theorem in mathematics